, or Spirinchus lanceolatus, is an anadromous fish (smelt) native to Hokkaido, Japan.

Description 
This fish averages 15 centimeters in length, with a maximum recorded length of 70 cm. It is generally dark on the back with a silver-white underside.

Etymology 
The fish is said to resemble a willow leaf, and its Japanese name reflects this; shishamo, is derived from the Ainu name for the same fish, susam, which is supposed to be derived from a compound of Ainu susu "willow" + ham "leaf", hence its name in Chinese characters (柳葉魚 jukujikun, where the characters have no phonetic relation to the word).

Food use 
In Japanese cuisine, this fish is grilled or fried whole and served with its roe intact.

Due to declining catches in recent years, attempts have been made to commercially farm the fish in Japan.

References

Spirinchus
Hokkaido
Fish of Japan
Fish described in 1913